The Ghironda is the International Festival of Arts and Popular Culture of the Five Continents. It was established in 1995 in Martina Franca, with the intention of attracting the attention of the public and tourists to the historical sites of the southern Italian region of Apulia and to facilitate exchanges of music, art and culture from around the world.

History
In the summer of 1994, some students developed the idea of a festival which could leave its mark on the culture of their city. The festival would meet three conditions: enhancing the old part of Martina Franca, bringing various forms of art from the world and local traditions and involve young people. The choice of name was oriented on a musical instrument popular in the Middle Age, the hurdy-gurdy, “ghironda” in Italian, which embodies the verb “girare” (to turn), the distinguishing feature of the itinerant festival, and music, considered as the only universal language. The festival is still organized by the Ghironda Association since 1995. It aims to increase ambitions and shows in several cities of Apulia. Just one city was involved in 1995 whereas 14 municipalities are now involved. The first edition of the Ghironda Festival lasted 2 days, now it lasts 9 days. It attended by over 390 artists from all over the world with over 1,200 events offered to 2 million viewers.

Festival
The festival is characterized by multiculturalism, the encounter and exchange between cultures from all over the world, along with the mix of dance, theater, cabaret with music, to generate evocative synesthesia and attractive fusions.
The Ghironda promotes tourism in towns away from the mass tourism, turning alleys, narrow streets and squares of their historic centers, in beautiful stages.
The festival contributes to the development, enhancement and vitality of the oldest part of the towns in Apulia through music and entertainment.
Over the last 15 editions, 14 cities hosted the Ghironda: Alberobello, Bari, Corato, Castellaneta Marina, Ceglie Messapica, Grottaglie, Francavilla Fontana, Foggia, Martina Franca, Massafra, Monopoli, Taranto, Trani, Otranto. To facilitate the combination of culture and tourism over all the year, the Ghironda (launched as Ghironda Summer Festival) splits with initiatives in winter (Ghironda Winter) dealing with multiculturalism, entertainment and quality.

Artists
The Ghironda offers a new way of thinking about culture through traditions and customs from around the world and the performances of artists who come from the theater and the big stages to perform on the street, in the most authentic historic sites and cities of Apulia.
Over the years, the festival hosted famous artists as Billy Cobham, Angelique Kidjo, Incognito, Marlene Kuntz, Max Gazzè, Maurizio Nazzaro, Naïf, La Fame di Camilla, Sisters & Daughters of Praise, Earth, Wind & Fire, Pacifico, Lura, Rachelle Ferrell, Dobet Gnahorè, Oscar D'León.

Other names from all over the world:
 Bernard Snyder, one man band from Germany;
 Jack Tama Orchestra, percussionists from Côte d'Ivoire;
 Sonia Aimy Duo, world music from Niger;
 Mr. Pejo's Wandering Dolls, theater masks from Russia;
 Hosoo and Transmongolia, traditional music/singing Höömii from Mongolia;
 Sun Sooley, reggae from Senegal;
 Violentango, modern tango in Argentina;
 Zacheo Tolga, tango/jazz/world music from Italy and Netherlands;
 Yuntamalandra, traditional carnival music from Argentina and Uruguay;
 Railroad Bill, skiffle music from Wales;
 Fanfara Kalashnikov, Balkan music from the Balkans;
 La Banda di Piazza Caricamento, world music from Africa, Europe, America and Asia;
 The Fabulous Boogie Boys, swing and rock’n’roll from England;
 Tribal Percussion, percussionists from Senegal;
 Alessandra Caselli, Italian actress;
 Arakne Mediterranea, singing and dancing from Salento (South part of Apulia);
 Menamenamò, 21 musicians of pizzica, a typical Salento's dance;
 Contrabbanda, 27 winds from Accademia Napoletana;
 Renato Curci, mime and actor from Bari;
 Eddie Hawkins, gospel from USA;
 Milk&Stout, Irish folk;
 Mamuthones, Sardegna tradition;
 Milon Mela, music, fire dance and martial art from India;
 Nikola Diklic Duo, Serbian gypsy guitarists;
 Amorosi Duo, Croatian musicians;
 Otanazetra Orquestra, samba from Brazil;
 Four for Tango, musicians and dancers from Argentina;
 Doris Cuban sound, son cubano;
 Antony Trahair, juggler from England;
 Laudari, Irish folk;
 Duo Resonante, musicians from Denmark;
 Kankobà, percussionists from Senegal;
 Trio Araguaney, Venezuela;
 Theaker Von Ziarno, acrobat, trapeze artist from New Zealand;
 Leopardman, juggler from Australia;
 Romuald Poplonky, one man band from Poland;
 Zeduardo Martins, Brazilian music;
 Gnawa sidi Mimoun, music from Marocco;
 Los del Paraguay, folk music of South America;
 Rocky Lawrence, blues from USA;
 Daniel Oldaker, cabaret, acrobat and mime in Melbourne, Australia;
 Tova Snyder, painter and muralist from USA;
 Mass ‘Ndiaye, Senegal;
 Hosoo, musicians from Mongolia;
 !Mahw, musicians from Germany;
 Eduardo Lopes, string puppets from Brazil;
 Armando Andreoli, Argentina;
 Tamae, Madagascar;
 Yardbird sax, Italy;
 Adesa, acrobats e percussionists from Ghana;
 Street Rats, musicians from Switzerland and Luxembourg;
 Denise Serge Kiminu and Rolando Armel Nzonzi, djembe and malonga vibi ntaba from Congo;
 Biancorino, clown from Brazil;
 Trio Emilio Tolga, from Netherlands;
 Jean Marie Olive, organs from France;
 Road 6 sax, Hungarian quartet;
 Ruach, from Poland;
 Keita, balafon from Mali;
 Circo Columpio, acrobats from France and Spain;
 Cosmic Sausages, burlesque from England;
 Duo Minsk, Slavic folk and classical music from Belarus;
 Les Misusumbi, percussionists, singing and dancing from Congo;
 Nazarenes, reggae from Ethiopia and Sweden;
 Rafael Teixido, puppetry from Argentina;
 Raillroad Bill, skiffle music from Wales;
 Ray Mundo, shadow theater from France;
 Sonics, trapeze artists from Italy;
 Tatiana Zakharova Trio, music from Russia and Argentina;
 Voyagerics, Canadian folk;
 Wadumbah Aboriginal Dance Group, aboriginal music and dance from Australia;
 Sjlaba, Polish dancers;
 Naat Beliot and Kocani Orchestra, Macedonia;
 Ben's Belinga, Camerun;
 Sen Maru and Shusen, jugglers from Japan;
 Pianotaimnent, pianist from Germany;
 Afro Jambo Acrobats, African circus from Kenya;
 Basketballjones, juggling fire from New Zealand;
 Capoeira Akè, music and dance from Brazil;
 Maria Carvalho, fado music from Portugal;
 Guarapo, salsa Mexico/Cuba/Germany;
 Top Shelf Jazz, swing and tip tap, United Kingdom/Australia;
 Jean Marie Olive, French popular music;
 Tibetan monks Sera JE, Tibetan music and dance;
 Tolga Trio, jazz from Argentina, Spain and Netherlands.
 Strings on Fire from Australia

External links
 
 

Arts festivals in Italy
Festivals established in 1995
1995 establishments in Italy